Campolo is a surname. Notable people with the surname include:

Antonio Campolo (1897–1959), Uruguayan soccer player
Bart Campolo, American humanist speaker and writer
Placido Campolo (1693–1743), Italian painter
Tony Campolo (born 1935), American sociologist, pastor, author, and public speaker